Enga is one of the provinces in Papua New Guinea (PNG). It is located in the north most region of the highlands of PNG, having been divided from the Western Highlands to become a separate province when the provinces were created at the time of independence in 1975. The people of Enga are called Engans—they are a majority ethnic group—speaking one language in all its five districts: approximately 500,000 people. A small minority of Engans' land on the eastern side of the region remained in the Western Highlands, their territory being accessible by road from Mount Hagen but not directly from elsewhere in Enga territory.

History
Europeans—typically Australian gold prospectors—originally entered what is now Enga province from the east in the late 1920s, although the best-known exploration of Enga took place during the early 1930s when Mick Leahy and a party of men travelled from what later became Mount Hagen to the site of the future Wabag and then south through the Ambum Valley to what later became East Sepik.

Culture
Engans are divided into three subgroups, the Mae, the Raiapu, and the Kyaka.

Like many other highland Papua New Guineans living west of the Daulo Pass (between Chimbu Province and Eastern Highlands Province), the traditional Engan settlement style is that of scattered homesteads dispersed throughout the landscape. Historically sweet potato was the staple food, sometimes supplemented by pork. The modern diet places an increasing emphasis on store bought rice and tinned fish and meat. Pigs remain a culturally valued item with elaborate systems of pig exchange also known as "tee" that mark social life in the province. The Raiapu practice extensive agriculture in their highland region. Sweet potatoes are the major crop, forming two-thirds of the Raiapu diet. They also raise pigs.

The Raiapu Enga believe in a variety of supernatural beings, although anthropologist Richard Feachem states that the Raiapu "derive no joy or comfort from their religious beliefs" due to the pervasively indifferent or malevolent nature of those spirits. The yalyakali, or "sky people," are fair-skinned and beautiful deities whose idyllic lives in the clouds mirror the agricultural and clan structure of the Raiapu below but lack the sadness of ordinary life. They are considered remote and unapproachable by humans. Feachem states that "the remaining spirit beings (ghosts and demons) are an aggressive and bellicose group who are mercilessly engaged in an endless cycle of revenge and mischief." The yuumi nenge, or "destructive ground force," are ghosts which cause deaths from exposure in the forest. A timongo is a spirit which leaves a human body upon death and wanders the forests as "a source of continual fear and alarm for the living," particularly the still-living members of their own immediate families, against whom they bear "bitter grievances." Also living in the wild forests, as well as caves and pools, are evil, carnivorous demons known as pututuli, which can change their shape but are often seen as being extremely tall with two-fingered claws. The Raiapu believe that human babies are occasionally switched by female demons with pututuli babies. Topoli are human sorcerers who possess secret knowledge of spells or other esoteric knowledge, and can defend against and communicate with hostile spirits. They "may be described as a healer of broken limbs, or a catcher of lost ghosts," writes Feachem.

Districts and LLGs
The province has six districts, and each district has one or more Local Level Government (LLG) areas. For census purposes, the LLG areas are subdivided into wards and those into census units.

Provincial leaders

The province was governed by a decentralised provincial administration, headed by a Premier, from 1978 to 1995. Following reforms taking effect that year, the national government reassumed some powers, and the role of Premier was replaced by a position of Governor, to be held by the winner of the province-wide seat in the National Parliament of Papua New Guinea.

Premiers (1978–1995)

Regional Member/Governors (1995–present)

Members of the National Parliament

The province and each district is represented by a Member of the National Parliament.  There is one provincial electorate and each district is an open electorate.

References

External links
 Enga Waipii - Naimanya Anda - Sponsored and supported by Forrest Data Systems a PNG owned technology firm.

 
Provinces of Papua New Guinea
Highlands Region